The i-Opener was a low-cost internet appliance produced by Netpliance (now known as TippingPoint) between 1999 and 2002. The hardware was sold as a loss leader for a monthly internet service.  Because of the low cost of the hardware, it was popular with computer hobbyists, who modified it to run desktop PC software without the internet service.

History 
Netpliance introduced the i-Opener in November 1999 at a $99 promotional price.  It was designed to be an easy-to-use, low-cost internet appliance for first-time users of the World Wide Web.  Access to the internet was limited to Netpliance's own service plan.  The hardware was sold below cost as a loss leader, with the expectation that Netpliance would recoup the money lost in manufacturing costs via its service plan.  Analysts estimated the cost of the hardware to be $300–$400, and Netpliance cited costs of $499.  The price was planned to increase to $199 after the promotional period.  Shortly after the device's introduction, an engineer discovered that it used commodity computer hardware.  By modifying the hardware, he was able to load his own software onto the i-Opener, bypassing the need for the subscription service plan.  Although this disrupted Netpliance's business model, Netpliance initially welcomed these users, assuming that most customers would not be willing to install custom parts.  As demand among computer hobbyists grew, retail outlets reported shortages, and Netpliance attempted to prevent custom hardware or software from being installed on new stock.  Netpliance instead directed people to their developer program.  In April 2000, Netpliance canceled existing orders on its website if buyers refused to accept a $499 termination fee for the service plan.  Buyers protested the change in the terms of sale, and Netpliance was fined $100,000 by the Federal Trade Commission in 2001.  By July 2000, the price of the i-Opener had quadrupled to $400, and Netpliance left the internet device market in January 2002.

Specifications
The i-Opener had a 10", 800×600 LCD display with stereo speakers, a 180 MHz IDT WinChip C6 Socket 7 CPU, a single SO-DIMM socket with a 32 MB module, and a 16 MB SanDisk flash module housing the QNX operating system. Connectivity was via single PS/2, USB, a parallel port for a printer, and a 56k modem.

See also 

 3Com Audrey
 Virgin Webplayer
 Nettop

References 

Information appliances
Computer-related introductions in 1999